Oscar Wilde is a 1960 biographical film about Oscar Wilde, made by Vantage Films and released by 20th Century Fox. The film was directed by Gregory Ratoff and produced by William Kirby, from a screenplay by Jo Eisinger, based on the play Oscar Wilde by Leslie Stokes and Sewell Stokes. The film starred Robert Morley (as Oscar Wilde), Ralph Richardson, Phyllis Calvert and Alexander Knox.

Plot
The plot primarily focuses on the litigation surrounding Wilde's libel suit against the Marquess of Queensberry, and the subsequent accusation of Wilde's homosexuality.

Cast
Robert Morley as Oscar Wilde
Ralph Richardson as Sir Edward Carson
Phyllis Calvert as Constance Wilde
John Neville as Lord Alfred Douglas
Alexander Knox as Sir Edward Clarke
Dennis Price as Robbie Ross
Edward Chapman as the Marquess of Queensberry
Martin Benson as George Alexander

Production
This was one of two films about Wilde released in 1960, the other being The Trials of Oscar Wilde. They were both released in the last week of May 1960.

Author and former film extra Brian Edward Hurst gives a detailed description of a scene he witnessed during filming where Morley (as Wilde) attempted to pick up a newspaper boy on a foggy London street. Hurst's book: Heaven Can Help - the Autobiography of a Medium describes the day's filming at Walton Studios.

The attempted seduction scene was cut from the final version. This movie was a lower budget production which was compared unfavorably with the wide-screen, technicolor version The Trials of Oscar Wilde.

Release
The film had a charity gala at the Carlton on 22 May 1960.

References

External links

1960 films
1960s biographical drama films
1960s historical drama films
British historical drama films
British black-and-white films
British biographical drama films
British LGBT-related films
British courtroom films
1960s English-language films
Films directed by Gregory Ratoff
Films set in the Victorian era
Cultural depictions of Oscar Wilde
Biographical films about poets
1960 LGBT-related films
LGBT-related drama films
20th Century Fox films
1960s British films
Biographical films about LGBT people